I Love My Mom is the debut record by North Carolina-based musician Indigo De Souza. It was self-released in June 2018 but was given a full re-release by Saddle Creek Records in June of 2021.

Composition
The "playful, spunky, and unpredictable" songs on Mom have been seen as "folksy" garage pop, "steady" grunge and indie rock.

Critical reception

Abby Jones for Pitchfork called the album "imperfect, unabashed, and endearing", while Marcy Donelson for AllMusic called it "an especially candid and personal set" where "De Souza solidly find[s] her footing."

Track listing

Personnel
Adapted from the record's Bandcamp page.

Indigo De Souza  
 Indigo De Souza - lead vocals, guitar, keys
 Owen Stone - bass, guitar, keys
 Jake Lenderman - drums, guitar 

Technical
 Indigo De Souza - production
 Owen Stone - production 
 Jake Landerman - production 
 Colin Miller - recording, mixing, mastering

Artwork and design
 Kimberly Oberhammer - cover artwork

References

2018 debut albums 
Saddle Creek Records albums
Indigo De Souza albums